Kwame Alexander (born August 21, 1968) is an American writer of poetry and children's fiction. His verse novel The Crossover won the 2015 Newbery Medal and was selected as an Honor book for the Coretta Scott King Award.

Personal life and education
Alexander was born in Manhattan, New York, and grew up in Chesapeake, Virginia. His father was a scholar and book publisher and his mother was an educator. His given name, Kwame, comes from Ghana and means "born on a Saturday," although Alexander was born on a Wednesday.

Alexander attended Virginia Tech, where he took a writing class with Nikki Giovanni.

Books
Alexander's picture book Acoustic Rooster and His Barnyard Band, was selected for the 2014 "Michigan Reads! One State, One Children's Book" program. He won a 2020 Newbery Honor for his illustrated poem The Undefeated.

Alexander runs the Bookinaday program to introduce children to writing and publishing. He is a regular contributor to National Public Radio's Morning Edition program.

Publications

 Tough Love: Cultural Criticism and Familial Observations on the Life and Death of Tupac Shakur, ed. (1996)
Do the Write Thing (2002) (with Nina Foxx)
Kwame Alexander's Page-to-Stage Writing Workshop (2016)

Novels
He Said, She Said: A Novel (2013)
The Crossover: A Novel (2015)
Booked (2016)
Solo (2017) (with Mary Rand Hess)
Rebound (2018) (prequel to The Crossover)
Swing (2018) (with Mary Rand Hess)
The Door of No Return (2022)

Picture books
Acoustic Rooster and His Barnyard Band (2011)
Indigo Blume and the Garden City (2012)
Little Boys Soar (2014)
Surf's Up (2016)
How to Read a Book (2019), illustrated by Melissa Sweet
The Undefeated (2019), illustrated by Kadir Nelson
An American Story (2023)

Poems 
The Flow: New Black Poets in Motion, ed. (1994)
Just Us: Poems & Counterpoems, 1986–1995 (1995)
360°: A Revolution of Black Poets, ed. (1998)
Kupenda: Love Poems (2000)
Dancing Naked on the Floor: poems and essays (2005)
The Way I Walk: short stories and poems for Young Adults, ed. (2006)
Crush: Love Poems (2007)
Family Pictures: Poems and Photographs Celebrating Our Loved Ones, ed. (2007)
An American Poem (2008)
And Then You Know: New and Selected Poems (2008)
The Book Party (2016)
The Playbook: 52 Rules to Aim, Shoot, and Score into in This Game Called Life (2017)

References

External links

Official website
Kwame Alexander Author Profile
Audio of author reading Acoustic Rooster
Preliminary Guide to the Kwame Alexander Papers, 1990–2007, Special Collections Research Center, Estelle and Melvin Gelman Library, The George Washington University

American children's writers
African-American children's writers
Newbery Medal winners
Writers from Virginia
Living people
20th-century American male writers
21st-century American male writers
Virginia Tech alumni
People from Herndon, Virginia
1968 births
20th-century American poets
21st-century American poets
African-American poets
20th-century African-American writers
21st-century African-American writers
African-American male writers